Eusolex is the trade name of a number of UV absorbers:
Avobenzone (Eusolex 9020)
Dibenzalhydrazine (Eusolex 6653)
4-Methylbenzylidene camphor (Eusolex 6300)
Octyl methoxycinnamate (Eusolex 2292)
Oxybenzone (Eusolex 4360)